Les Frères Isola refers to brothers: 
 Émile Isola (1860–1945)
 Vincent Isola (1862–1947), Algerian-born conjurers and theatre directors 

People from Blida
Pieds-Noirs
French people of Italian descent
Recipients of the Legion of Honour
French magicians
Opera managers